Utricularia campbelliana is a small epiphytic, perennial carnivorous plant that belongs to the genus Utricularia. U. campbelliana is endemic to northern South America, where it is found in Guyana and Venezuela and most likely also Brazil, though no positive records exist from that country. It was originally published and described by Daniel Oliver in 1887. It is named in honor of William Hunter Campbell, an attorney and amateur botanist who lived in Georgetown, Guyana. It has been seen flowering between August and April. In his 1989 monograph on the genus, Peter Taylor noted that at least one specimen has been recorded as being visited by a hummingbird and it is likely that both U. campbelliana and U. quelchii are bird-pollinated.

See also 
 List of Utricularia species

References 

Carnivorous plants of South America
Flora of Guyana
Flora of Venezuela
campbelliana
Epiphytes
Taxa named by Daniel Oliver